My Beloved is a 1958 Soviet romance drama film directed by Iosif Kheifits.

Plot 
The film tells about the doctor Vladimir Ustimenko, who loves his work with all his heart and Varya Stepnov, who as a child wanted to become a famous actress, but became a geologist. Suddenly there comes a war that separates them...

Cast 
 Aleksey Batalov
 Inna Makarova
 Pyotr Konstantinov
 Leonid Bykov
 Boris Chirkov	
 Ivan Pereverzev
 Yuriy Medvedev
 Tsetsiliya Mansurova
 Lidiya Shtykan
 Pyotr Kiryutkin
 Pavel Usovnichenko
 Mikhail Yekaterininsky

References

External links 
 
 Дорогой мой человек on Kinopoisk

1958 films
1950s Russian-language films
Soviet drama films
1958 drama films